Tirwa is a town (nagar panchayat) in Kannauj district in the Indian state of Uttar Pradesh.

The road to the Lakh-Bahosi bird sanctuary goes through Tirwa. It is situated on the National Highway 91A.

Demographics
 India census, Tirwa had a population of 20,229. Males constitute 53% of the population and females 47%. Tirwa has an average literacy rate of 67%, higher than the national average of 59.5%: male literacy is 73%, and female literacy is 61%. In Tirwa, 15% of the population is under 6 years of age.

There is a locally well-known, Inter College called Durga Narayan Inter College, which was established in 1923 by King Durga Narayan Singh. The college building and hostel, located near Annapurna Mandir, are good examples of the architecture of the period. The Government Medical College, Kannauj is also located in Tirwa.

Religious Importance
There are two Hindu temples which hold religious significance:

1- Annapurna Mandir A fair starts in July around this temple, where a large number of people come from across India. 
2- Dauleshwar Temple

Annapurna Mandir is related to the deity Annpurna whereas the Dauleshwar temple is related to the Shiva.

References

Cities and towns in Kannauj district